Taral Hicks (born September 21, 1974) is an American actress and singer. Hicks is best known for her acting in such films as 1993's American crime drama film A Bronx Tale and her singing in such work as her 1997 debut studio album This Time which peaked at No. 4 on Billboard Bubbling Under Hot 100 Singles.

Raised in Teaneck, New Jersey, Hicks graduated from Teaneck High School in 1994.

Career

Acting
Hicks began her film career with a role in the critically acclaimed 1993 film, A Bronx Tale. Her subsequent film roles were small: 1995's Just Cause with Sean Connery and Laurence Fishburne, and 1996's Educating Matt Waters and The Preacher's Wife with Whitney Houston. She appeared in the movie Belly in 1998. In 2000, she appeared on screen in the short film, Are You Cinderella?, with actor Wood Harris. Her later film roles were in independent films such as 2005's The Salon, with Vivica A. Fox, Dondre Whitfield, and Darrin Henson; 2006's Forbidden Fruits with Ella Joyce, Fredro Starr, and R&B singer Keith Sweat; 2007's Humenetomy; and 2010's Ex$pendable. Hicks featured in the HBO television series Subway Stories in 1997. Two guest roles followed: 2002's 100 Centre Street in the episode titled "Fathers", and a 2003 episode of Soul Food: The Series titled "The New Math".

Hicks co-starred in the musical stage play Tyler Perry's Aunt Bam's Place with Paris Bennett, Cassi Davis, Jeffrey Lewis, and Melonie Daniels. It had a 3-day run beginning August 30, 2011 in Atlanta, Georgia (Cobb Energy Center) and was filmed for a DVD release on June 12, 2012.

Music
In 1995, Hicks signed a deal with Motown Records and released an album titled This Time. The single "Ooh, Ooh Baby", written by and featuring Missy Elliott, charted on the Billboard R&B singles chart. However, the lead single intended to debut her singing career was "Distant Lover", an uptempo track produced by Teddy Riley. The album did not take off until the second single, "Silly", a remake of the classic R&B hit by Deniece Williams, was released. Featuring a black-and-white music video directed by Hype Williams, the single charted well on the R&B chart. After collaborating on the video for "Silly", Williams cast Hicks as in his directorial film debut, 1998's Belly, as Keisha, DMX's girlfriend. The video for "Silly" appeared in one of the film's scenes. Hicks has expressed interest in pursuing a career in gospel music.

Personal life
Hicks is a 1993 graduate of Grace Dodge Vocational High School in the Bronx, New York. She is the younger sister of actress and singer D'atra Hicks. In 1999, Hicks began dating Loren Dawson, and the couple married in 2001.

Discography

Albums

Singles

Soundtracks
 1996: The Associate (on "Yes We Can Can" with Chantay Savage, LaShanda Reese and The Pointer Sisters)

Filmography

Film

Television

References

External links
 
 
 

Cover of May 2021 Issue of REVÖ MAGAZINE www.revozine.us

1974 births
Actresses from New Jersey
Actresses from New York City
20th-century African-American women singers
American film actresses
African-American women singer-songwriters
American contemporary R&B singers
Living people
People from the Bronx
Teaneck High School alumni
Singer-songwriters from New Jersey
Singers from New York City
African-American actresses
American television actresses
Singer-songwriters from New York (state)